Mobiloil Inlet is an ice-filled inlet, nurtured by several northeast and east flowing glaciers, lying between the Rock Pile Peaks and Hollick-Kenyon Peninsula along the east coast of the Antarctic Peninsula. It was discovered by Sir Hubert Wilkins in a flight on December 20, 1928, and named by him after a product of the Vacuum Oil Company of Australia. Yates Spur, a prominent rock spur, projects from the south side of the inlet.

References

Inlets of Graham Land
Bowman Coast
ExxonMobil